Yeon Jung-hoon (born November 6, 1978) is a South Korean actor. He is best known for generational epic East of Eden (2008), crime procedural Vampire Prosecutor (2011-2012) and the domestically popular weekend drama Pots of Gold (2013). Outside of acting, Yeon hosted the first three seasons of Top Gear Korea, the South Korean version of the BBC show, and is a cast member of the popular variety-reality show 2 Days & 1 Night.

Early life
Yeon is the only son and younger of two children of veteran actor Yeon Kyu-jin. He was sent to the United States as a teenager and lived with his aunt while attending junior high and high school. He spent his freshman year of college at the ArtCenter College of Design but returned to South Korea due to the 1997 Asian financial crisis and continued his education at Myongji University, majoring in product design. Despite his father being an actor, he never showed any inclination towards the entertainment industry until he was in college. He made his acting debut whilst a college student and eventually decided to pursue it as a career after graduating. His father had misgivings over his new career path out of concern; Yeon later stated that his father was finally convinced after he was named Best New Actor at the 2003 KBS Drama Awards.

Career

Early career and military service: 1999-2005
In 1999 Yeon made his debut in the drama Wave. After appearing in several dramas in minor or supporting roles, he first came to prominence with domestic audiences in the highly-rated 2003 daily soap Yellow Handkerchief and portrayed lovers with his future wife. They both went on to win the Best New Actor and Best New Actress awards respectively at the year-end KBS Drama Awards. He was cast in Sad Love Story as a last-minute replacement for Song Seung-heon, who was embroiled in a scandal involving his exemption from mandatory military service and forced to pull out. Yeon himself nearly did not get the role as his character's background story required him to film on location in New York City for several weeks and he had to get a visa at short notice. The drama received much attention as it was also broadcast overseas in Japan and other countries in the Middle East and Africa. Although domestic viewership was lower than expected, Yeon was praised for ably stepping into the role at the last minute and it led to a rise in popularity for him, especially in Japan. It was his last drama before enlisting for mandatory military service in November 2005.

Hosting Top Gear Korea and domestic popularity: 2008-2013
After his discharge, Yeon began diversifying into other genres and largely shied away from romantic melodramas to avoid being typecast. His comeback project was the critically-acclaimed 2008 generational drama East of Eden in which he and Song Seung-heon portrayed brothers who grew up in a mining town during the turbulent 1970s and later find themselves on opposing sides of the law. He then starred in his first sageuk (historical period drama) Jejungwon. From 2011 to 2012, Yeon, an avid car enthusiast and former Formula 4 driver, was a co-host of Top Gear Korea and hosted the first three seasons before leaving to concentrate on acting and other interests. He also starred in the OCN legal drama Vampire Prosecutor, portraying the titular character, a prosecutor who becomes a vampire and hides his newfound powers while secretly using it to solve crimes. To prepare for the action scenes required of his role, he lost weight and learned Jeet Kune Do for several months prior to filming. The drama became the most watched cable drama of the year 2011 and received rave reviews from both critics and viewers. Its popularity prompted the producers to bring it back for a second season.

Yeon's next two roles were as chaebol businessmen in romantic comedies. In the 2012 cable drama Can Love Become Money, he played the CEO of a hospitality company who hides his sensitive and caring side behind an unpleasant and emotionless exterior. He reunited with his East of Eden co-star Han Ji-hye the following year in Pots of Gold, in which he portrayed the eldest son of a chaebol family embroiled in a saga involving his father's mistresses. A domestic ratings hit, the weekend drama consistently topped its time slot and he was named Best Actor in a Serial Drama at the 2013 MBC Drama Awards.

Overseas projects and 2 Days & 1 Night: 2014-present
Yeon's next project was the 2014 TVB microfilm A Time of Love where he played the boyfriend of Linda Chung. After mostly portraying straight-laced protagonists, he played the main antagonist in the drama Mask, winning rave reviews for his portrayal of a remorseless, cold-hearted lawyer. He was nominated for the Excellence Award, Actor in a Mid-length Drama at the 2015 SBS Drama Awards, losing to his Mask co-star Ju Ji-hoon. He made a guest appearance in the 2016 JTBC drama My Horrible Boss before making his Hollywood debut in the Hong Kong-Chinese-American collaboration buddy cop film Skiptrace and played the right-hand man of a businessman-cum-mob boss (played by Winston Chao).

Yeon returned to cable drama in the action-comedy-thriller Man to Man and played the main antagonist, an unscrupulous businessman with a painful past. He then co-headlined the weekend melodramas Bravo My Life and My Healing Love, the latter of which earned him the Top Excellence Award in a Soap Opera at the 2018 MBC Drama Awards. He returned to the supernatural genre in the cable comedy-thriller Possessed, which aired in early 2019. In November 2019, Yeon was announced as a fixed cast member of 2 Days & 1 Night for the upcoming new season. In 2020 he starred in the Channel A drama Lie After Lie with Lee Yoo-ri and it ended its run as one of the most watched cable dramas of the year.

Personal life
Yeon married actress Han Ga-in on April 26, 2005 after a two-year courtship. They have two children, a daughter (born April 13, 2016) and a son (born May 13, 2019).

In November 2005 Yeon enlisted for mandatory military service at the 306th Replacement Battalion in Uijeongbu, Gyeonggi Province. As he was married, he was allowed to commute to his duty station from home after completing the five weeks of basic training. He was assigned to the 52nd Infantry Division and discharged in October 2007. He was previously a United States permanent resident but gave up his green card when he entered the entertainment industry, thus making him eligible for conscription.

Filmography

Film

Television series

Television show

Discography

Commercials

Awards and nominations

References

External links
 
Yeon Jung-hoon at DBM Entertainment 

1978 births
Living people
20th-century South Korean male actors
21st-century South Korean male actors
Art Center College of Design alumni
Myongji University alumni
Goksan Yeon clan
JYP Entertainment artists
Place of birth missing (living people)
South Korean male film actors
South Korean male television actors
South Korean television presenters